Allan "Al" Dean Feuerbach (born January 14, 1948) is a former American track and field athlete. He competed in the shot put at the 1972 and 1976 Olympics and finished in fifth and fourth place, respectively. He missed the 1980 Games due to the boycott by the United States. He did however receive one of 461 Congressional Gold Medals created especially for the spurned athletes.

On May 5, 1973, he broke Randy Matson's seven-year-old world record in the shot put by throwing 21.82 meters (71' 7") at the San Jose Invitational at San Jose State College.  Just weeks later, competing in a different sport, olympic-style weight lifting, he finished first in the heavyweight division at the U.S. weightlifting championships. Feuerbach currently works as a freelance audio technologist.

He was a four time American champion in the shot put, plus he added three indoor championships and a AAA Championships.

In 2016, he was elected into the National Track and Field Hall of Fame.

He later became a sound engineer, working with CNBC.

References

External links

 
 
 
 
  
  
 Mt. SAC Relays Profile
 Feuerbach at the 1976 US. Olympic Trials  @ 27:40
 

1948 births
Living people
American male shot putters
Athletes (track and field) at the 1972 Summer Olympics
Athletes (track and field) at the 1976 Summer Olympics
Olympic track and field athletes of the United States
People from Preston, Iowa
Track and field athletes from San Jose, California
World record setters in athletics (track and field)
Pan American Games gold medalists for the United States
Athletes (track and field) at the 1971 Pan American Games
Athletes (track and field) at the 1979 Pan American Games
Track and field athletes from California
Pan American Games medalists in athletics (track and field)
Congressional Gold Medal recipients
Medalists at the 1971 Pan American Games